Uwe Fabig (born 17 October 1961)  was a professional ice hockey player. He captained the Krefeld Pinguine team in 1991.

Career statistics

References

1961 births
Living people
German ice hockey defencemen
Kassel Huskies players
Krefeld Pinguine players
Sportspeople from Krefeld